The Statue Makers of Hollywood is the third and final album by the rock band The Alpha Band, released in 1978.

Track listing 
 "Tick Tock" (T-Bone Burnett, David Mansfield, Steven Soles)
 "Rich Man" (Burnett)
 "Mighty Man" (Burnett)
 "Perverse Generation" (Burnett)
 "Two Sisters" (Soles, David Carson)  
 "Two People in the Modern World" (Soles)
 "Back in My Baby's Arms Again" (Burnett)
 "Thank God" (Hank Williams)

Personnel
T-Bone Burnett – vocals, guitar, piano
David Mansfield – guitar, mandolin, organ, dobro, background vocals
Steven Soles – vocals, guitar, piano
Stephen Bruton – vocals, guitar
Bill Maxwell – drums
Everett Bryson – percussion
Lee Pastora – percussion, conga
David Miner – bass
Rob Stoner – bass, background vocals
Bill Thedford – background vocals
James Felix – background vocals
Daniel Moore – background vocals
Perry Morgan – background vocals
Cindy Bullens – background vocals
Christ Memorial Church of God In Christ Radio Choir – background vocals
Andraé Crouch – background vocals
Jessy Dixon – background vocals
Scott Page – Saxophone
David Duke – French horn
Larry Ford – trumpet
Jim Gordon – saxophone
David Hungate – trombone
Jerry Jumonville – saxophone
Jerry Peterson – saxophone
Roy Poper – trumpet
Jim Price – trombone
Jay Pruitt – trumpet
Alan Robinson – French horn

References

1978 albums
Arista Records albums
The Alpha Band albums